Christoph Klarer (born 14 June 2000) is an Austrian professional footballer who plays as a centre back for Fortuna Düsseldorf.

Career

Southampton
On 8 July 2016, Southampton confirmed, that they had signed Klarer on a professional contract from Rapid Wien. Klarer started for the club's U18 squad. In April 2019, he signed a new contract until the summer 2021. 

On 7 January 2020, Klarer joined Austrian club SKN St. Pölten on loan for the 2019–20 season. In February, he made his debut on the match against Admira Wacker Mödling.

Fortuna Düsseldorf
On 5 October 2020, Klarer moved to Fortuna Düsseldorf on a contract until 30 June 2024.

References

External links

National team stats

Living people
2000 births
Association football defenders
Austrian footballers
Austria youth international footballers
Southampton F.C. players
SKN St. Pölten players
Fortuna Düsseldorf players
Austrian Football Bundesliga players
2. Bundesliga players
Austrian expatriate footballers
Austrian expatriate sportspeople in England
Expatriate footballers in England
Austrian expatriate sportspeople in Germany
Expatriate footballers in Germany